Patersonia glabrata, commonly known as leafy purple-flag, or bugulbi in the Cadigal language, is a species of flowering plant in the family Iridaceae family and is endemic to eastern Australia. It is a perennial herb or subshrub with linear leaves and pale violet flowers.

Description 

Taxonomy 
Patersonia glabrata was first formally described in 1810 by Robert Brown  in his Prodromus Florae Novae Hollandiae et Insulae Van Diemen. The specific epithet (glabrata) means "nearly glabrous".

Distribution and habitat
Leafy purple-flag grows on the coast and tablelands of eastern Australia from 18°South in Queensland through New South Wales to Bairnsdale in Victoria with disjunct populations on Wilsons Promontory and French Island. It is found in forest, woodland and coastal heath.

References

glabrata
Flora of New South Wales
Flora of Queensland
Flora of Victoria (Australia)
Plants described in 1810
Taxa named by Robert Brown (botanist, born 1773)